Novorossiya is an abandoned military air base of the Soviet Air Force in Primorsky Krai, Russia, located 29 km (18 miles) east of Artyom.

During the Cold War, it served a tactical aviation airfield.  One of the main tenants was the  50th ORAP (Composite Aviation Regiment).  In 1967, satellite analysis showed a regiment of 34 MiG-15 Fagot or MiG-17 Fresco at the airfield.  Following an increase in tensions after the Sino-Soviet split the airfield was an operating location for the Ilyushin Il-28 Beagle, with as many as 25 aircraft based at the airfield.

The airfield fell into disuse after the Cold War.

References

Soviet Air Force bases